Roger Mills (born c.1950) is a retired British motorcycle speedway rider.

Mills rode in two matches for Sheffield Tigers and Long Eaton Archers in 1967 before joining the newly formed Leicester Lions in 1968. He rode in seventeen British League Division One matches for Leicester that year, averaging 2.58, dropping down to the second division in 1969 with Middlesbrough Teessiders, for whom he averaged over 7 points in two seasons there. In 1971, wanting to ride for a team closer to his home, he moved to Long Eaton Rangers, for whom he continued to score highly until his retirement at the end of the 1973 season.

Mills represented Great Britain at junior level and England at Division Two level.

References

Living people
British speedway riders
English motorcycle racers
Leicester Lions riders
Middlesbrough Bears riders
Long Eaton Archers riders
Hackney Hawks riders
King's Lynn Stars riders
Newport Wasps riders
Year of birth missing (living people)